Progress Report is a 2013 Indian Malayalam-language film, directed by Sajan and produced by Selvan Thamalam. The film stars Lalu Alex, Siddique, Geetha and Sukumari. mani

Cast
Lalu Alex
Siddique
Geetha
Sukumari
K. P. A. C. Lalitha

Soundtrack
The music was composed by G. K. Harish Mani.

References

2013 films
2010s Malayalam-language films